Senator Giddings may refer to:

Ammi Giddings (1822–1882), Connecticut State Senate
J. Wight Giddings (1858–1933), Michigan State Senate
James Giddings (fl. 1850s), Wisconsin State Senate